Martín Bonjour (born 4 September 1985) is an Argentine footballer.

Career
Bonjour began his career in Argentina with Olimpo and made his debut in the first division during the 2003 season. He was sent on loan to Racing de Olavarría for the duration of the 2004 season. He moved to Uruguay in 2005 and joined Rentistas, appearing in 34 matches for Rentistas and scoring three goals. During the 2006 season he was sent on loan to Lech Poznań in Poland. At the conclusion of his contract with Rentistas, Bonjour joined Universidad César Vallejo in Peru. He enjoyed a solid season with César Vallejo before returning to Uruguay in 2009. This time the Argentine defender signed with Uruguayan Primera División side Rampla Juniors. While with Rampla Juniors Bonjour scored five goals in 52 appearances for the Montevideo club. During the Clausura portion of the 2010–11 season Bonjour was sent on loan to rivals Liverpool de Montevideo, where he scored one goal in 10 appearances.

On 6 January 2012, Bonjour was signed by Vancouver Whitecaps FC of Major League Soccer. He made his debut for the team on 3 March 2012 against the Montreal Impact. Bonjour was a starter on the team alongside Jay DeMerit, but lost his starting role to newcomer Andy O'Brien. Bonjour was waived by Vancouver Whitecaps on 25 January 2013.

On 4 January 2019, Bonjour joined Liga Nacional side Club Deportivo Olimpia in Honduras.

References

External links
 
 
 
 

1985 births
Living people
Sportspeople from Buenos Aires Province
Argentine people of French descent
Argentine footballers
Association football defenders
Olimpo footballers
C.A. Rentistas players
Lech Poznań players
Rampla Juniors players
Liverpool F.C. (Montevideo) players
Vancouver Whitecaps FC players
S.D. Quito footballers
Guillermo Brown footballers
Montevideo City Torque players
S.D. Aucas footballers
C.D. Olimpia players
Liga Nacional de Fútbol Profesional de Honduras players
Argentine expatriate footballers
Argentine expatriate sportspeople in Poland
Argentine expatriate sportspeople in Uruguay
Argentine expatriate sportspeople in Ecuador
Expatriate footballers in Poland
Expatriate soccer players in Canada
Expatriate footballers in Uruguay
Expatriate footballers in Ecuador
Major League Soccer players